Leila Charlotte Evelyn Petronella Buckley (16 January 1917 – 25 January 2013), née Porter, known by her pen name Frances Lobb, was an English poet, novelist and translator. She was the daughter of Lt.-Col. Adrian Sydney Morton Porter OStJ, a King's Messenger, and the author Rose Henniker Heaton. Her grandfather was the postal reformer Sir John Henniker Heaton, 1st Baronet.

She married, firstly, the renowned Oxford classicist Courtenay Edward Stevens in 1938. She and Courtenay Stevens were divorced. She married, secondly, Philip Strachan Buckley in 1949.

During the Second World War she worked in the Political Intelligence Department of the Foreign Office.

Works

Novels 
 The Vow, Book Guild, 1999
 The Strangers, Art & Educational Publishers, 1947
 Handsome Johnnie, Faber and Faber, 1941

Translations 

Leila Buckley translated works between English, German, Italian, French, Latin and ancient Greek. She is perhaps most famous as the English translator of Dino Buzzati's The Bears' Famous Invasion of Sicily.

She translated Mussolini's Memoirs 1942-1943, (George Weidenfeld & Nicolson, 1949) into English.

Other works include:

 The Day of the Bomb, Karl Bruckner, 1962
 Momo (novel), Michael Ende, 1973, as The Grey Gentlemen, Puffin Books, 1974
 The Golden Pharaoh, Karl Bruckner, Burke, 1959 
 The Twenty Four Love Sonnets, Louise Labé, Euphorion, 1950 (trans. from 16th century Middle French and Italian)
 The Prince of Mexico, Federica de Cesco, Burke, 1968
 Saturn and Melancholy: Studies in the history of national philosophy, religion and art, Raymond Klibansky, Erwin Panofsky & Fritz Saxl, Thomas Nelson & Sons, 1964.

References

1917 births
2013 deaths
English women poets
German–English translators
Italian–English translators
20th-century translators
20th-century English women writers
20th-century English poets